Lee Jung-Hyo (born July 23, 1975) is a South Korean former football player and current manager.

He played for one club, Busan I'Park.

In March 2009, he announced his retirement.

Club career statistics

External links
 

1975 births
Living people
Association football defenders
South Korean footballers
Busan IPark players
K League 1 players